Western Division or West Division may refer to:

Locations 

Western Division (The Gambia)
Western Division, Fiji
West Division (Northern Ireland)
Western Division (New South Wales)
West Division, Western Australia

Units 

13th (Western) Division (United Kingdom)
19th (Western) Division (United Kingdom)
Western Rifle Division

Sport 

Western Division (AFL)
West Division (CFL), a division of the Canadian Football League
West Division (NHL)
American League Western Division
National League Western Division
AFC West Division
NFC West Division
West Division of the Mid-American Conference
West Division of the Southeastern Conference
Western Division (cricket), a division of Minor League Cricket

See also 

 Western Conference (disambiguation)
 Central Division (disambiguation)
 Eastern Division (disambiguation)
 Northern Division (disambiguation)
 Southern Division (disambiguation)
 
 
 
 Division (disambiguation)
 Western (disambiguation)
 West (disambiguation)